Chícharo is one of the forty subbarrios of Santurce, San Juan, Puerto Rico.

Demographics
In 2000, Chícharo had a population of 722.

In 2010, Chícharo had a population of 641 and a population density of 21,366.7 persons per square mile.

See also
 
 List of communities in Puerto Rico

References

Santurce, San Juan, Puerto Rico
Municipality of San Juan